Ercole Gallegati (21 November 1911 – 19 August 1990) was an Italian wrestler. He won bronze medals in Greco-Roman wrestling at the 1932 and 1948 Olympics and 1934 European Championships. He also competed in the 1936 Olympics, both in freestyle and Greco-Roman wrestling, and at the 1952 Olympics. Domestically he won 20 Italian titles in Greco-Roman and 11 in freestyle wrestling between 1931 and 1956. After retiring from competitions he became a wrestling coach and a member of the Faenza city council.

References

External links
 
 

1911 births
1990 deaths
Olympic wrestlers of Italy
Wrestlers at the 1932 Summer Olympics
Wrestlers at the 1936 Summer Olympics
Wrestlers at the 1948 Summer Olympics
Wrestlers at the 1952 Summer Olympics
Italian male sport wrestlers
Olympic bronze medalists for Italy
Olympic medalists in wrestling
Medalists at the 1948 Summer Olympics
Medalists at the 1932 Summer Olympics
20th-century Italian people